John Crook may refer to:

 John Crook (ethologist) (1930–2011), British ethologist and Buddhist
 John Crook (conductor) (1847–1922), English conductor and composer
 John Crook (politician) (1895–1970), Australian politician
 John Crook (bishop) (born 1940), Bishop of Moray, Ross and Caithness, 1999–2006
 John Crook (classicist) (1921–2007)

See also
John Crooke (disambiguation)
John Crooks (disambiguation)